Blurred may refer to:

 Blurred vision, blurring of an image due to incorrect focus
 Blurred lanternshark, a species of dogfish shark
 Blurred (play), an Australian play by Stephen Davies about schoolies week
 Blurred (film), a 2002 Australian film about schoolies week
 "Blurred" (song), a song by Pianoman

See also
 Blurr, different fictional characters in the Transformers franchise